Porn Again is a 2001 album by the Smut Peddlers, a group composed of Mr. Eon and DJ Mighty Mi from The High & Mighty, and Cage.

Music 
Guest appearances include Kool Keith, Kool G Rap, R.A. the Rugged Man, Copywrite, and Apani B. Fly.

Background 
The album was re-released on March 7, 2006, with four bonus tracks that were formerly only available on vinyl. The re-release is entitled Porn Again Revisited.

The album cover features Beetlejuice, an entertainer most notable for his appearances on The Howard Stern Show. This was a decision made by Rawkus.

Track listing
"Beetlejuice Intro"  – 0:31
featuring Beetlejuice
"Smut Council"  – 2:04
"Medicated Minutes"  – 4:45
"Talk Like Sex Part 2"  – 3:38
featuring Kool G Rap
"Amazing Feats"  – 3:47
"Pimpology by Beetlejuice"  – 0:42
featuring Beetlejuice
"That Smut"  – 3:45
"Anti Hero's"  – 4:00
featuring Copywrite
"54"  – 3:20
"Josie"  – 4:44
featuring Apani B. Fly, DJ Lord Sear
"Beats, Boxes and Boobtube"  – 1:06
featuring DJ Lord Sear
"Diseases"  – 3:54
"One by One" (Revamped)  – 4:17
"Stank MC's"  – 3:52
featuring Kool Keith
"My Rhyme Ain't Done"  – 3:32
"Bottom Feeders"  – 4:05
featuring R.A. the Rugged Man
"Beetlejuice Outtakes"  – 0:37
featuring Beetlejuice
"Red Light" (produced by The Alchemist) (bonus track, Porn Again Revisited only)
"Anti Hero's Remix" (bonus track, Porn Again Revisited only)
"For the Record" (bonus track, Porn Again Revisited only)
"First Name Smut" (bonus track, Porn Again Revisited only)

Album chart positions

Singles chart positions

References

2001 debut albums
Rawkus Records albums
Hip hop albums by American artists
Albums produced by the Alchemist (musician)
Cage (rapper)